A quadruple century (an individual score of 400 runs or more) has been scored eleven times in first-class cricket by nine different players. It was first achieved in 1895 by Archie MacLaren, playing for Lancashire against Somerset, while the most recent occurrence was by Sam Northeast. Brian Lara,  is the only player to have managed the feat in Test cricket. Lara holds the record for the highest score in first-class cricket, having made 501 not out in 1994. Bill Ponsford is the only other player to have scored two quadruple centuries, doing so in 1923 and 1927 for the Victoria cricket team. Ponsford's scores were both made at the Melbourne Cricket Ground, making it one of two venues to have hosted two quadruple centuries, along with the County Ground, Taunton. Two teams have conceded two quadruple centuries; Somerset and Queensland.

Don Bradman's score of 452 not out was made in the shortest time of all quadruple centuries; his innings lasting 415 minutes (6 hours and 55 minutes). Lara's Test quadruple was the longest, taking 778 minutes (12 hours and 58 minutes). Bradman's quadruple century was also the only one to be scored in a team's second batting innings. Three of the quadruple centuries were made in each of Australia and England, two in Pakistan, one in India and one in Antigua and Barbuda.

History

Prior to 1895, the highest score in first-class cricket was W. G. Grace's 344. This total was surpassed by Archie MacLaren, playing for Lancashire during a County Championship match against Somerset. MacLaren opened the batting for his side at the County Ground, Taunton, and struck 1 six and 64 fours during his innings, which lasted well into the second day of the three-day match. MacLaren's score remained the only quadruple century for over 25 years, until Bill Ponsford accumulated 429 runs in his third first-class match. Ponsford improved on his own record four years later, reaching 437 runs; both of his quadruple centuries were scored at the Melbourne Cricket Ground. The next quadruple century was again scored in Australia, on this occasion by Don Bradman. Playing at the Sydney Cricket Ground, Bradman passed Ponsford's total, finishing on 452 not out. His innings, which lasted 415 minutes, is the quickest of any quadruple century.

The next three quadruple centuries were scored in the Indian subcontinent, where according to MacLaren's biographer Michael Down "standards of play are sometimes hard to assess". B. B. Nimbalkar was the first batsman to score a quadruple century without setting a new record for the highest score, hitting 443 not out for Maharashtra at Poona Club Ground. Maharashtra's opposition, Kathiawar, conceded the match on the third day without batting for a second time. Nimbalkar so far is the only player to have scored a first-class quadruple century but completed his career without ever playing an international match. In 1959, Hanif Mohammad eclipsed Bradman's record, scoring 499 runs before he was run out. Playing at the Karachi Parsi Institute Ground, he was trying to reach 500 runs before the end of the third day when he was run out in the final over. Fifteen years later, Aftab Baloch became the sixth player to score a quadruple century. Captaining Sind at the National Stadium, Karachi, Baloch scored 428.

In 1988, Graeme Hick made the second quadruple century in England. Coming 93 years after the first, it was similarly scored at the County Ground, Taunton. In an innings which Vic Marks described as "clinical rather than charismatic", Hick reached 405 not out from 469 deliveries: his first 300 runs came from 411 balls, and the last hundred were scored off 58 more. England was once again the host nation for the next quadruple century—which became a quintuple century—when Brian Lara made the record high score in first-class cricket, hitting 501 not out for Warwickshire against Durham in 1994. In contrast to Hick's patient innings, Lara's total was one of only two quadruple centuries that were scored at faster than a run a minute. In a match that had been ruined as a contest by rain, Lara asked his captain not to declare their innings so he could try to surpass Hanif Mohammad's total. Aiming for 500, he started the final over of the day on 497, and reached the landmark with a four, scored from the penultimate ball of the over.

Ten years later, Lara became the only batsman to score a quadruple century in Test cricket when he scored 400 not out while captaining the West Indies against England at the Antigua Recreation Ground. When he passed Matthew Hayden's Test record score of 380, play was delayed as Baldwin Spencer, the Prime Minister of Antigua and Barbuda, came onto the field to offer his congratulations. Lara continued to bat until he reached 400.

In July 2022, Sam Northeast scored 410 not out for Glamorgan against Leicestershire. Northeast, aged 32, had not yet played an international match of any kind.

Quadruple centuries

Key

See also
List of Test cricket triple centuries
List of One Day International cricket double centuries

Notes

References

Cricket-related lists
First-class cricket records